Daniel Gott (July 10, 1794 – July 6, 1864) was an American lawyer and politician who served as a U.S. representative for New York's 24th congressional district from 1847 to 1851.

Early life and education 
Born in Hebron, Connecticut, Gott attended local public schools. He moved to Pompey, New York in 1817, where he studied law.

Career 
He was admitted to the bar in 1819 and commenced practice in Pompey, New York. Among the aspiring attorneys who studied with him was L. Harris Hiscock.

Gott was elected as a Whig to the Thirtieth and Thirty-first Congresses (March 4, 1847 – March 3, 1851). In 1848, he gave an impassioned speech to the House of Representatives against the proposed emancipation of slaves in the District of Columbia. Gott described the actions of abolitionists of the northern states as "impertinent interference with the slaves" and "impertinently intruding themselves into the domestic and delicate concerns of the South, understanding neither the malady to be corrected nor the remedy to be applied".

He moved to Syracuse, New York, in 1853 and resumed the practice of law.

Personal life 
He died in Syracuse, New York, July 6, 1864. He was interred in Pompey Hill Cemetery, Pompey, New York. Congressman Charles B. Sedgwick (1815–1883) and State Senator Henry J. Sedgwick (1812–1868) were his stepsons.

References

1794 births
1864 deaths
Politicians from Syracuse, New York
Whig Party members of the United States House of Representatives from New York (state)
19th-century American politicians
Lawyers from Syracuse, New York
19th-century American lawyers